Herz is a German surname meaning heart. Notable people with the surname include:

 Adam Herz, American writer and producer
 Adolf Herz, Austrian Engineer, inventor of Herz spark plug, photographer and first editor of Camera Magazine
 Alice Herz, American pacifist
 Alice Herz-Sommer, (1903–2014), Czech-born Jewish pianist, oldest Holocaust survivor
 Daniela Herz (born 1954), German businesswoman
 Eberhard Herz, German American footballer
 Günter Herz (born 1940), German businessman
 Henri Herz,  Austrian pianist, teacher, and composer
 Henriette Herz (de Lemos), German social leader 
 John H. Herz, American scholar of international relations
 Josef E. Herz, American scientist, organic chemistry
 Juraj Herz (1934–2018), Slovak film director, writer and actor
 Martin F. Herz, American diplomat, ambassador
 Max Herz (1905-1965), German businessman
 Michael Herz (businessman) (born 1943), German businessman
 Michael Herz, American film producer, director and screenwriter
 Naphtali Herz Imber, itinerant poet, wrote lyrics of Hatikvah, national anthem of Israel
 Winfried Herz, German footballer
 Wolfgang Herz (born 1950), German businessman

See also 
Hertz, the unit of frequency
Hertz (disambiguation)

German-language surnames